

299001–299100 

|-id=020
| 299020 Chennaoui ||  || Hasnaa Chennaoui-Aoudjehane (born 1964), a Moroccan geochemist at Hassan II University in Casablanca. She is a member of the Nomenclature Committee of Meteorites, and former council member, of the Meteoritical Society. She classified and named nine observed falls in Morocco, including Tissint, the fifth Martian meteorite fall (Src). || 
|}

299101–299200 

|-id=134
| 299134 Moggicecchi ||  || Vanni Moggi Cecchi (born 1965), an Italian mineralogist and meteoriticist, who was the Curator of the Museum of Planetary Sciences in Prato, Tuscany || 
|}

299201–299300 

|-bgcolor=#f2f2f2
| colspan=4 align=center | 
|}

299301–299400 

|-id=362
| 299362 Marthacole ||  || Martha Cole (born 1945) was a professional photographer based in San Diego, California, in the 1980s and 1990s. || 
|}

299401–299500 

|-bgcolor=#f2f2f2
| colspan=4 align=center | 
|}

299501–299600 

|-bgcolor=#f2f2f2
| colspan=4 align=center | 
|}

299601–299700 

|-bgcolor=#f2f2f2
| colspan=4 align=center | 
|}

299701–299800 

|-id=755
| 299755 Ericmontellese ||  || Eric Montellese (born 1981), an American software and computer engineer || 
|-id=756
| 299756 Kerryaileen ||  || Kerry Aileen Masiero (born 1984), sister of American astronomer Joseph Masiero who discovered this minor planet || 
|-id=777
| 299777 Tanyastreeter ||  || Tanya Streeter (born 1973), a British-Caymanian-American champion freediver. She held the freediving record with a depth of 525 feet (160 meters). || 
|}

299801–299900 

|-bgcolor=#f2f2f2
| colspan=4 align=center | 
|}

299901–300000 

|-bgcolor=#f2f2f2
| colspan=4 align=center | 
|}

References 

299001-300000